Victor R. Ambros (born 1953, Hanover, New Hampshire) is an American developmental biologist who discovered the first known microRNA (miRNA). He is a professor at the University of Massachusetts Medical School in Worcester, Massachusetts.

Background
Ambros was born in New Hampshire. His father was a Polish war refugee and Victor grew up on a small dairy farm in Hartland, Vermont in a family of eight children, and went to school at Woodstock Union High School. He received his BS in Biology from the Massachusetts Institute of Technology in 1975 and completed his PhD in 1979 at the Massachusetts Institute of Technology, under the supervision of Nobel laureate David Baltimore. Ambros continued his research at MIT as the first postdoctoral fellow in the lab of future Nobel laureate H. Robert Horvitz. He became a faculty member at Harvard University in 1984 and moved to Dartmouth College in 1992. Ambros joined the faculty at the University of Massachusetts Medical School in 2008, and currently holds the title of Silverman Professor of Natural Sciences in the program in Molecular Medicine, endowed by his former Dartmouth student, Howard Scott Silverman.

Discovery of microRNA
In 1993, Ambros and his co-workers Rosalind Lee and Rhonda Feinbaum reported in the journal Cell that they had discovered single-stranded non-protein-coding regulatory RNA molecules in the organism C. elegans. Previous research, including work by Ambros and Horvitz, had revealed that a gene known as lin-4 was important for normal larval development of C. elegans, a nematode often studied as a model organism. Specifically, lin-4 was responsible for the progressive repression of the protein LIN-14 during larval development of the worm; mutant worms deficient in lin-4 function had persistently high levels of LIN-14 and displayed developmental timing defects. However, the mechanism for control of LIN-14 remained unknown.

Ambros and colleagues found that lin-4, unexpectedly, did not encode a regulatory protein. Instead, it gave rise to some small RNA molecules, 22 and 61 nucleotides in length, which Ambros called lin-4S (short) and lin-4L (long). Sequence analysis showed that lin-4S was part of lin-4L: lin-4L was predicted to form a stem-loop structure, with lin-4S contained in one of the arms, the 5' arm. Furthermore, Ambros, together with Gary Ruvkun (Harvard), discovered that lin-4S was partially complementary to several sequences in the 3' untranslated region of the messenger RNA encoding the LIN-14 protein. Ambros and colleagues hypothesized that lin-4 could regulate LIN-14 through binding of lin-4S to these sequences in the lin-14 transcript in a type of antisense RNA mechanism.

In 2000, another C. elegans small RNA regulatory molecule, let-7, was characterized by the Ruvkun lab  and found to be conserved in many species, including vertebrates. These discoveries confirmed that Ambros had in fact discovered a class of small RNAs with conserved functions. These molecules are now known as microRNA. Ambros was elected to the United States National Academy of Sciences in 2007. He was elected a Fellow of the American Academy of Arts and Sciences in 2011.

Awards
 2002: Newcomb Cleveland Prize of the American Association for the Advancement of Science for the most outstanding paper published in Science (co-recipient with the laboratories of David P. Bartel and Thomas Tuschl)
 2005: Lewis S. Rosenstiel Award for Distinguished Work in Medical Research of Brandeis University (co-recipient with Craig Mello, Andrew Fire, and Gary Ruvkun)
 2006: Genetics Society of America Medal for outstanding contributions in the past 15 years
 2007: Elected to the National Academy of Sciences
 2008: Gairdner Foundation International Award (co-recipient)
 2008: Benjamin Franklin Medal in Life Science of The Franklin Institute (co-recipient with Gary Ruvkun and David Baulcombe)
 2008: The Albert Lasker Award for Basic Medical Research (co-recipient with Gary Ruvkun and David Baulcombe)
 2008: Massachusetts General Hospital Warren Triennial Prize (co-recipient with Gary Ruvkun)
 2009: Dickson Prize from University of Pittsburgh in medicine
 2009: Louisa Gross Horwitz Prize from Columbia University (co-recipient with Gary Ruvkun)
 2009: Massry Prize from University of Southern California (co-recipient with Gary Ruvkun)
 2012: Dr. Paul Janssen Award for Biomedical Research from Johnson & Johnson (co-recipient with Gary Ruvkun)
 2013: Keio Medical Science Prize from Keio University (co-recipient with Shigekazu Nagata)
 2014: Gruber Prize in Genetics from Gruber Foundation (co-recipient with Gary Ruvkun and David Baulcombe)
 2014: Wolf Prize in Medicine from Wolf Foundation (co-recipient with Gary Ruvkun and Nahum Sonenberg)
 2015: Breakthrough Prize in Life Sciences
 2016: March of Dimes Prize in Developmental Biology (co-recipient with Gary Ruvkun)

References

Living people
American geneticists
American people of Polish descent
Massachusetts Institute of Technology School of Science alumni
University of Massachusetts faculty
Harvard University faculty
Dartmouth College faculty
Fellows of the American Academy of Arts and Sciences
Recipients of the Albert Lasker Award for Basic Medical Research
Members of the United States National Academy of Sciences
1953 births
Massry Prize recipients